Rossana Podestà (born Carla Dora Podestà; 20 June 1934 – 10 December 2013) was an Italian actress who worked mainly in Italy from the 1950s to the 1970s.

Biography
Podestà was born in Tripoli in the Italian colony of Libya. She spent her first years there, moving to Rome after World War II. At sixteen she was discovered by director Léonide Moguy during the preparation of the cast for the film Domani è un altro giorno; this inaugurated a career in which she participated in sixty films, in Italy and abroad.

In Italy, she resided in Dubino (Sondrio province). She married and then divorced movie producer Marco Vicario.  From 1980 she lived with the mountain climber, explorer and journalist Walter Bonatti, who died alone in 2011, aged 81, at a private clinic where the hospital management would not allow his partner of more than 30 years to spend the last minutes of his life together because the two were not married.  On 10 December 2013, Podestà died in Rome, aged 79.

Acting career

Podestà's most memorable role was as Helen in Helen of Troy, produced by Robert Wise in 1956. She could not speak English so she learned her lines by rote with a voice coach. The movie gave Podestà international exposure, and she performed alongside a young Brigitte Bardot. 
Thanks to her starring in the Mexican film Rossana, she became very popular in Latin America.

Podestà also starred in the movie Ulisse (1955), directed by Mario Camerini, and in the sixties and seventies she acted in some romantic movies, including Paolo il caldo and Il prete sposato which led to a double page of five half-naked pictures in the US Playboy of March 1966. Under the headline "Trio Con Brio" featuring European actresses, she appeared alongside Christiane Schmidtmer (from Germany) and Shirley Anne Field (from the UK).

Her last performance was in Secrets Secrets (1985), directed by Giuseppe Bertolucci. She died on 10 December 2013.

Selected filmography

1950: Strano appuntamento - Their daughter
1951: Tomorrow Is Another Day - Stefania
1951: The Seven Dwarfs to the Rescue - Princess Snow White
1951: Cops and Robbers - Liliana Bottoni
1952: Viva il cinema! - Marisa
1952: Gli Angeli del quartiere - Lisa
1952: I, Hamlet - Ofelia
1952: The Phantom Musketeer - Ornella
1952: Don Lorenzo
1953: Viva la rivista!
1953: Finishing School - Pereira
1953: Addio, figlio mio! - Elsa
1953: Rossana - Rossana
1953: Voice of Silence 
1954: Ulysses - Nausicaa
1955: Le ragazze di San Frediano - Tosca
1955: Nosotros dos - María Pedrosa
1955: Non scherzare con le donne
1955: Songs of Italy
1956: Helen of Troy - Helen
1956: Playa prohibida - Isabella
1956: Santiago - Doña Isabella
1958: The Amorous Corporal - Bethi
1958: Raw Wind in Eden - Costanza Varno
1958: The Sword and the Cross - Marta
1959: Temptation - Caterina
1959: Un vaso de whisky - María
1960: Fury of the Pagans - Leonora
1961: La grande vallata
1961: Slave of Rome - Antea
1962: Alone Against Rome - Fabiola
1962: The Golden Arrow - Jamila
1963: Sodom and Gomorrah - Shuah 
1963: The Virgin of Nuremberg - Mary Hunter
1964: The Naked Hours - Carla
1964: Last Plane to Baalbek - Isabel Moore
1965: Seven Golden Men - Giorgia
1966: Seven Golden Men Strike Again - Giorgia
1970: The Swinging Confessors - Silvia
1971: Man of the Year - Cocò Lampugnani
1972: L'uccello migratore - Delia Benetti
1973: The Sensual Man - Lilia
1975: Il gatto mammone - Rosalia
1976: Il letto in piazza - Serena
1977: Pane, burro e marmellata - Simona
1979: 7 ragazze di classe - Ivonne
1980: Sunday Lovers - Clara (segment "Armando's Notebook")
1980: Tranquille donne di campagna - Anna Maldini
1983: Hercules - Hera
1985: Secrets Secrets - Maria, Rosa's Mother (final film role)

References

External links

 

1934 births
2013 deaths
People from Tripoli, Libya
Italian film actresses
Italian colonial people in Libya
Libyan people of Italian descent
Libyan emigrants to Italy